Mvolyé or Mvolye is a neighbourhood of Yaoundé, Cameroon. Around 1900, during Cameroon's colonial period, the site was part of the lands ruled by Karl Atangana. Atangana donated part of the area to the German Pallottine Fathers, a Roman Catholic missionary group. The Ewondo people had previously been unable to settle it due to a large rock there. The Fathers built a permanent mission, which opened Central and Eastern Cameroon to Christianisation. Atangana remained chief of the area.

Local culture and heritage

Places and monuments

Basilica Mary Queen of the Apostles of Mvolyé
The basilica is located at the southern exit of Yaoundé on the hill of Mvolyé.

References
 Ifuoleng, Afekefuni Muo (3 November 2005). "Persistently & Consistently Avoiding God in Cameroon (2)". The Post Online. Accessed 5 November 2006.
 Nde, Paul. "Ntsama, Charles Atangana". The Dictionary of African Christian Biography. Accessed 30 October 2006.
 Ngoh, Victor Julius (1996): History of Cameroon Since 1800. Limbe: Presbook.

Neighbourhoods in Cameroon
Populated places in Cameroon
Yaoundé